Bandawe is a community in Malawi on the west shore of Lake Malawi. It is the site of one of the first Christian missions in Malawi, Bandawe Mission. This became the second location for Livingstonia Mission.

Bandawe Mission

The Livingstonia mission established a small station at Bandawe in Tonga country in 1878 (location approx -11.921583, 34.175229). In 1881 the mission moved to Bandawe to escape the bad climate of Cape Maclear and bouts of malaria that struck the mission. The photo opposite is of the Graves at this first Livingstonia near Cape Maclear and are still visible at approx -14.037001, 34.830356. In 1894 the mission moved once again from Bandawe to Kondowe, again for health reasons. The former mission is a historical site, the ruins include a cemetery.

References

Populated places in Central Region, Malawi